Sir William Stratford Dugdale, 2nd Baronet,  (29 March 1922 – 13 November 2014) was the chairman of Aston Villa from 1975 to 1978. Dugdale arrived at Aston Villa as a director when they were in the third division, having been relegated due to poor performances on and off the pitch. He left the club in 1982, the year they won the European Cup. Following several successful years as a director in the early-1970s, he was elected chairman in 1975, taking over the position from Doug Ellis, the package holiday businessman, before being replaced by Harry Kartz.

Biography

Dugdale was born on 29 March 1922, the son of Sir William Francis Stratford Dugdale, 1st Bt of the Noble House of Stratford, and Margaret Gilmour. Educated at Eton College and Balliol College, Oxford, he succeeded to the title of 2nd Baronet Dugdale, of Merevale and Blyth, co. Warwick [UK, 1936] on 18 April 1965.

He fought in the Second World War, where he was mentioned in despatches, gaining the rank of captain in the service of the Grenadier Guards, having been commissioned into that regiment on 27 September 1941 and after serving in the ranks in the Royal Berkshire Regiment. His service number was 207638. He was decorated with the award of the Military Cross (M.C.) in 1943 for outstanding bravery whilst under fire. He fought at Anzio, and ended the war guarding the German generals at Nuremberg.

He was a practising solicitor in 1949. He held the office of Justice of the Peace (J.P.) for Warwickshire in 1951 and office of Deputy Lieutenant (D.L.) of Warwickshire in 1955. He held the office of High Sheriff of Warwickshire for 1971. He held the office of Sheriff of Stratford-upon-Avon in 1976. He was invested as a Commander, Order of the British Empire (C.B.E.) in 1985.

He also enjoyed success in racing, riding in the Grand National in 1953 and then becoming the Chief Disciplinary steward in the Jockey Club, the organisation that ran the Racing industry.

He was chairman of General Utilities plc between 1988 and 1999 and was made head of the National Water Council in 1983, helping then Prime Minister Margaret Thatcher with the  unions in the water industry. He lived in 2003 at Merevale Hall, Atherstone, Warwickshire and at 24 Bryanston Mews West, London.

Family
He married, firstly, Lady Belinda Pleydell-Bouverie, daughter of William Pleydell-Bouverie, 7th Earl of Radnor and Helena Olivia Adeane, on 13 December 1952. Lady Belinda died of cancer in 1961. He married, secondly, Cecilia (Cylla) Mary Mount, daughter of Sir William Mount, 2nd Baronet and Elizabeth Nance Llewellyn, on 17 October 1967.

Children of Sir William Dugdale, Bt and Lady Belinda Pleydell-Bouverie:
 Laura Dugdale b. 20 September 1953
 Matilda Dugdale b. 15 May 1955
 Charlotte Dugdale b. 15 May 1955
 William Matthew Stratford Dugdale, 3rd Baronet b. 22 February 1959

Children of Sir William Dugdale, Bt and Cecilia Mary Mount:
 Adelaide Margaret Victoria Jane Dugdale b. 9 July 1970
 Thomas Joshua Stratford Dugdale b. 20 September 1974

Dugdale's niece, Elizabeth Dugdale, daughter of his brother Sir John Dugdale, is a god-daughter of Queen Elizabeth II.

The former Conservative Party leader and Prime Minister of the United Kingdom, David Cameron, is the nephew by marriage of Sir William Dugdale.

References

Citations
 [S8] Charles Mosley, editor, Burke's Peerage and Baronetage, 106th edition, 2 volumes (Crans, Switzerland: Burke's Peerage (Genealogical Books) Ltd, 1999), volume 1, page 888. Hereinafter cited as Burke's Peerage and Baronetage, 106th edition.
 [S300] Michael Rhodes, "re: Ernest Fawbert Collection," e-mail message to Darryl Roger Lundy, 8 February. Hereinafter cited as "re: Ernest Fawbert Collection."
 [S37] Charles Mosley, editor, Burke's Peerage, Baronetage & Knightage, 107th edition, 3 volumes (Wilmington, Delaware, USA: Burke's Peerage (Genealogical Books) Ltd, 2003). Hereinafter cited as Burke's Peerage and Baronetage, 107th edition.
[S37] Charles Mosley, Burke's Peerage and Baronetage, 107th edition, volume 1, page 1198.
[S8] Charles Mosley, Burke's Peerage and Baronetage, 106th edition, volume 1, page 889.

External links
British Army Officers 1939−1945, unithistories.com. Accessed 10 January 2023.

1922 births
2014 deaths
Military personnel from Warwickshire
Grenadier Guards officers
Royal Berkshire Regiment soldiers
Stratford family
Aston Villa F.C. directors and chairmen
English football chairmen and investors
High Sheriffs of Warwickshire
People educated at Eton College
Alumni of Balliol College, Oxford
Recipients of the Military Cross
English justices of the peace
Commanders of the Order of the British Empire
Baronets in the Baronetage of the United Kingdom
Deputy Lieutenants of Warwickshire
British Army personnel of World War II
20th-century English businesspeople